Gustavus Augustus Eisen (August 2, 1847 − October 29, 1940) was a Swedish-American polymath. He became a member of California Academy of Sciences in 1874 and a Life Member in 1883.  In 1893, he became the 'Curator of Archaeology, Ethnology, and Lower Animals' at the Academy.  He later changed titles to 'Curator of Marine Invertebrates'. In 1938, he was appointed as an 'Honorary Member', which is considered the highest honor from the Academy.

Biography
Eisen was born in Stockholm, Sweden, on August 2, 1847. He attended school at Visby and later graduated from the University of Uppsala in 1873. He came to
California that same year to participate in a biotic survey sponsored by the Swedish Academy of Sciences. He decided to make California his home and joined the California Academy of Sciences the following year.

He was known to have diverse interests, including "art and art history, archeology and anthropology, agronomy and horticulture, history of science, geography and cartography, cytology, and protozoology, as well as marine invertebrate zoology" 

A 2012 article in the San Francisco Chronicle describes him as, "One of those 19th century polymaths, Eisen also studied malaria-vector mosquitoes, founded a vineyard in Fresno, introduced avocados and Smyrna figs to California, campaigned to save the giant sequoias, and wrote a multivolume book about the Holy Grail."  

He is perhaps best known for his studies of oligochete worms and many species were named after him including those in the genus Eisenia.  In addition, he is considered to have been responsible for the introduction of the avocado and the smyrna fig to California and he wrote a detailed history of figs 

He was a correspondent of Charles Darwin and his work was referenced twice by Darwin in The Formation of Vegetable Mould through the Action of Worms.

Mt. Eisen, in the Sierra Nevada in California, was named after him.

World renown
Eisen's opinions were sought on the practicalities of new horticulture crops in Australia. His advice was valued in fig cultivation and in processing grapes into raisins.

Organisms named after him
Earthworms
 Achaeta eiseni Vejdovsky
 Diplocardia eiseni Michaelsen
 Eisenia eiseni  Levinsen
 Eisenia Malm
 Eisenia fetida
 Eisenia hortensis
 Eisenia andrei
 Eiseniona Omodeo
 Eisenoides Gates
 Eiseniella Michaelsen
 Eukerria eiseniana Rosa
 Fridericia eiseni Dózsa-Farkas

Brown algae
 Eisenia Areschoug
 Eisenia bicyclis
 Eisenia arborea Areschoug

Vascular Plants
 Phacelia eisenii Brandegee
 Bacopa eisenii (Kellogg) Pennell
 Clarkia eiseniana Kellog
 Ranunculus eiseni Kellog

Mosquitoes
 Anopheles eiseni Coquillett

Ant
 Atzeca foreleg eiseni Pergande

Bee
 Anthidiellum eiseni PergaCockerell
 Centris eisenii Fox
 Mesostenus eisenii Ashmead

Grasshopper
 Brachystola eiseni Bruner

Copepods
 Diaptomus eiseni Liljeborg

Zygoptera
 Enallagma eiseni Calvert

Tipulidae
 Erioptera eiseni Alexander

Diptera
 Hermetia eiseni Townsend
 Zophina eiseni Townsend

Spider
 Linyphia eiseni Banks
 Pardosa eiseni Thorell

Snake
 Tantilla eiseni Stejneger

Fish
 Xenotoca eiseni Rutter

Publications

 Eisen, G.A. 1888. On the anatomy of Sutroa rostrata, a new annelid of the sub-family Lumbriculina. Memoirs of the California Academy of Sciences 2(1):1–9.
 Eisen, G.A. 1890. The raisin industry. A practical treatise on the raisin grapes, their history, culture and curing. Available online at https://archive.org/details/raisinindustrypr00eise.
 Eisen, G.A. 1893. Anatomical studies on new species of Ocnerodrilus. Proceedings of the California Academy
 of Sciences, ser. 2, 3:228–290.
 Eisen, G.A. 1894. On California Eudrilidae. Memoirs of the California Academy of Sciences 2(3):21–62.
 Eisen, G.A. 1895. Pacific Coast Oligochaeta I. Memoirs of the California Academy of Sciences 2(4):63–122.
 Eisen, G.A. 1896. Pacific Coast Oligochaeta II. Memoirs of the California Academy of Sciences 2(5):123–200.
 Eisen, G.A. 1897. Plasmocytes; the survival of the centrosomes and archoplasm of the nucleated erythrocytes, as free and independent elements in the blood of Batrachoseps attenuatus Esch. Proceedings of the California Academy of Sciences, ser. 3, Zoology, 1(1):1–72.
 Eisen, G.A. 1897. Explorations in the Cape Region of Baja California. Journal of the American Geographical Society of New York, Vol. 29, No. 3 (1897), pp. 271–280.
 Eisen, G.A. 1899. Notes on North-American earthworms of the genus Diplocardia.  Zoological Bulletin  Vol. 2, No. 4, Feb., 1899 . https://www.jstor.org/stable/10.2307/1535422
 Eisen, G.A. 1900. Researches in American Oligochaeta, with especial reference to those of the Pacific coast and adjacent islands. Proceedings of the California Academy of Sciences, ser. 3, Zoology, 2(2):85–276.
 Eisen, G.A.  1900. Explorations in the Cape Region of Baja California.  Journal of the American Geographical Society of New York.  https://www.jstor.org/stable/10.2307/197262
 Eisen, G.A. 1900. The Spermatogenesis of Batrachoseps. Polymorphous spermatogonia, auxocytes, and spermatocytes. Journal of Morphology.  DOI: 10.1002/jmor.1050170102.
 Eisen, G. A. 1901. The fig: its history, culture, and curing, with a descriptive catalogue of the known varieties of figs. Available online here: https://archive.org/details/figitshistorycul00eise.
 Eisen, G.A. 1903. The earthquake and volcanic eruption in Guatemala in 1902. Bulletin of the American Geographical Society. https://www.jstor.org/stable/10.2307/197952.

References

Further reading

External links 

 

1847 births
1940 deaths
American naturalists
American zoologists
American curators
People associated with the California Academy of Sciences
Uppsala University alumni
Scientists from the San Francisco Bay Area
19th-century Swedish zoologists
20th-century Swedish zoologists